Philippe Léonard (born 14 February 1974) is a Belgian former professional footballer who played as a left back.

After playing most notably for Standard Liège and Monaco, he rarely appeared for his following four teams (including Standard again) in a 16-year professional career.

Léonard represented Belgium at Euro 2000, being an international over a 12-year period.

Club career
Born in Liège, Léonard started his professional career at Standard Liège. There, alongside Régis Genaux and Michaël Goossens, he was part of The Three Musketeers generation – with Roberto Bisconti playing a smaller role – hailed for their sporting talent but with a troublesome character.

He won the Belgian Cup in 1993, only 19, having scored in the final against R. Charleroi SC, and also helped the side to two runner-up league places (1992–93 and 1994–95), each time bowing out to Anderlecht.

Subsequently, Léonard moved to France where he played with AS Monaco FC, also having a brief stint with OGC Nice. Whilst at Monaco, he scored in the semifinal of the 1997–98 UEFA Champions League against Juventus, in a 4–6 aggregate loss, being the only Belgian player to score at this stage of the competition; in the previous round, he helped oust Manchester United on the away goals rule after a 1–1 draw at Old Trafford.

After two Ligue 1 titles with Monaco, to which he contributed with 38 games and two goals combined, Léonard returned to Standard, where he again finished second, in the 2005–06 season, again to Anderlecht. Subsequently, he had short spells abroad, with Feyenoord and FC Rapid București.

Léonard ended his career in 2009, at the age of 35, after not being able to find a new club. He subsequently took up writing columns in Belgian newspapers.

International career
Léonard played 26 times with Belgium, and was in the team for UEFA Euro 2000, where he appeared in the 2–1 win for the hosts against Sweden. His debut coming in 1994, he was a regular fixture in the next two years, as right back Genaux, but Belgium failed to qualify for Euro 1996.

They both lost their place with the arrival of coach Georges Leekens, and Léonard was dropped at the last minute for the 1998 FIFA World Cup. Because of a conflict with then coach Robert Waseige, he spent five years without being called after Euro 2000, so he also missed the 2002 World Cup in Japan and South Korea.

Honours
Standard Liège
Belgian Cup: 1992–93

Monaco
Ligue 1: 1996–97, 1999–2000
Coupe de la Ligue: 2002–03; Runner-up 2000–01
Trophée des Champions: 1997, 2000

References

External links
 
 
 
 
 Philippe Léonard Interview

1974 births
Living people
Footballers from Liège
Walloon sportspeople
Belgian footballers
Association football defenders
Belgian Pro League players
Standard Liège players
Ligue 1 players
AS Monaco FC players
OGC Nice players
Eredivisie players
Feyenoord players
Liga I players
FC Rapid București players
Belgium under-21 international footballers
Belgium international footballers
UEFA Euro 2000 players
Belgian expatriate footballers
Expatriate footballers in France
Expatriate footballers in Monaco
Expatriate footballers in the Netherlands
Expatriate footballers in Romania
Belgian expatriate sportspeople in France
Belgian expatriate sportspeople in Monaco
Belgian expatriate sportspeople in the Netherlands
Belgian expatriate sportspeople in Romania